The Nanakshahi calendar (Punjabi: ਨਾਨਕਸ਼ਾਹੀ ਜੰਤਰੀ ) is a tropical solar calendar used in Sikhism. It is based on the "Barah Maha" (Twelve Months), a composition composed by the Sikh gurus reflecting the changes in nature conveyed in the twelve-month cycle of the year. The year begins with the month of Chet, with 1 Chet corresponding to 14 March. The reference epoch of the Nanakshahi calendar is the birth of Guru Nanak Dev, corresponding to the year 1469 CE.

Etymology
The Nanakshahi Calendar is named after the founder of the Sikh religion, Guru Nanak Dev Ji.

History
Sikhs have traditionally recognised two eras and luni-solar calendars: the Nanakshahi and Khalsa. Traditionally, both these calendars closely followed the Bikrami calendar with the Nanakshahi year beginning on Katak Pooranmashi (full moon) and the Khalsa year commencing with Vaisakhi. The methods for calculating the beginning of the Khalsa era were based on the Bikrami calendar. The year length was also the same as the Bikrami solar year. According to Steel (2000), (since the calendar was based on the Bikrami), the calendar has twelve lunar months that are determined by the lunar phase, but thirteen months in leap years which occur every 2–3 years in the Bikrami calendar to sync the lunar calendar with its solar counterpart. Kay (2011) abbreviates the Khalsa Era as KE.

References to the Nanakshahi Era have been made in historic documents. Banda Singh Bahadur adopted the Nanakshahi calendar in 1710 C.E. after his victory in Sirhind (12 May 1710 C.E.) according to which the year 1710 C.E. became Nanakshahi 241. However, Singh (2008) states the date of the victory as 14 May 1710 CE. According to Dilgeer (1997), Banda "continued adopting the months and the days of the months according to the Bikrami calendar". Banda Singh Bahadur also minted new coins also called Nanakshahi. Herrli (1993) states that "Banda is supposed to have dated his coins according to his new calendar. Although Banda may have proclaimed this era, it cannot be traced in contemporary documents and does not seem to have been actually used for dating". According to  The Panjab Past and Present (1993), it is Gian Singh who "is the first to use Nanak Shahi Samvats along with those of Bikrami Samvats" in the Twarikh Guru Khalsa. According to Singha (1996), Gian Singh was a Punjabi author born in 1822. Gian Singh wrote the Twarikh Guru Khalsa in 1891.

The revised Nanakshahi calendar was designed by Pal Singh Purewal to replace the Bikrami calendar. The epoch of this calendar is the birth of the first Sikh Guru, Nanak Dev in 1469 and the Nanakshahi year commences on 1 Chet. New Year's Day falls annually on what is 14 March in the Gregorian Western calendar. The start of each month is fixed. According to Kapel (2006), the solar accuracy of the Nanakshahi calendar is linked to the Gregorian civil calendar. This is because the Nanaskhahi calendar uses the tropical year instead of using the sidereal year which is used in the Bikrami calendar or the old Nanakshahi and Khalsa calendars.

The amended Nanakshahi calendar was adopted in 1998 and released in 1999 by the Shiromani Gurdwara Prabhandak Committee ("SGPC") to determine the dates for important Sikh events. Due to controversy surrounding the amended calendar, it was shortly retracted. The calendar was re-released in 2003 by the SGPC with three dates: Guru Nanak Dev Ji's Birth, Holla Mohalla, and Bandi Chhor Divas kept movable as per the old Bikrami system as a compromise. The calendar was implemented during the SGPC presidency of Sikh scholar Prof. Kirpal Singh Badungar at Takhat Sri Damdama Sahib in the presence of Sikh leadership. The Mool Nanakshahi Calendar recognizes the adoption event, of 1999 CE, in the Sikh history when SGPC released the first calendar with permanently fixed dates in the Tropical Calendar. Therefore, the calculations of this calendar do not regress back from 1999 CE into the Bikrami era, and accurately fixes for all time in the future.

Features of the Nanakshahi calendar (2003)
Features of the original Nanakshahi calendar (2003 Version):
 Uses the accurate Tropical year (365 Days, 5 Hours, 48 Minutes, 45 Seconds) rather than the Sidereal year
 Called Nanakshahi after Guru Nanak (Founder of Sikhism)
 Year 1 is the Year of Guru Nanak's Birth (1469 CE). As an example,  CE is Nanakshahi {{#ifexpr: *100+ >= 314 |  |  }}.
 Is Based on Gurbani – Month Names are taken from Guru Granth Sahib
 Contains 5 Months of 31 days followed by 7 Months of 30 days
 Leap year every 4 Years in which the last month (Phagun) has an extra day
 Approved by Akal Takht in 2003

Months
The months in the 2003 version (also known as the Mool Nanakshahi Calendar) are:

Festivals and events (2003 version)
Dates of observance of festivals as determined by reference to the 2003 version.

Movable dates for Sikh Festivals in the 2003 and 2010 versions. (These change every year in line with the Lunar Phase)

Controversy
In 2010, the SGPC modified the calendar so that the dates for the start of the months are movable so that they coincide with the Bikrami calendar and changed the dates for various Sikh festivals so they are based upon the lunar phase. This has created controversy with some bodies adopting the original 2003 version, also called the "Mool Nanakshahi Calendar" and others, the 2010 version. By 2014, the SGPC had scrapped the Nanakshahi calendar from 2003 and reverted to the Bikrami calendar entirely, however it was still published under the name of Nanakshahi. The Sikh bodies termed it a step taken under pressure from the RSS and Shiromani Akali Dal. There is also some controversy about the acceptance of the calendar altogether among certain sectors of the Sikh world.

SGPC president, Gobind Singh Longowal, on 13 March 2018 urged all Sikhs to follow the current (2014) Nanakshahi calendar. The previous SGPC President before Longowal, Prof. Kirpal Singh Badungar, tried to appeal the Akal Takht to celebrate the birthday of Guru Gobind Singh on 23 Poh (5 January) as per the original Nanakshahi calendar, but the appeal was denied. The PSGPC and a majority of the other gurdwara managements across the world are opposing the modified version of the calendar citing that the SGPC reverted to the Bikrami calendar. They argue that in the Bikrami calendar, dates of many gurpurbs coincide, thereby creating confusion among the Sikh Panth.

According to Ahaluwalia (2003), the Nanakshahi calendar goes against the use of lunar Bikrami dates by the Gurus themselves and is contradictory. It begins with the year of birth of Guru Nanak Dev, but the first date, 1 Chet, is when Guru Har Rai was installed the seventh Guru. However, the first date of the Nanakshahi calendar (1 Chet) is based upon the Barah Maha of the Guru Granth Sahib, which has Chet as the first month. Pal Singh Purewal, as reported in the Edmonton Journal (March 2018) has stated that his aims in formulating the Nanakshahi calendar were, "first and foremost, it should respect sacred holy scriptures. Second, it should discard the lunar calendar and use only a solar one. Third, all the dates should be fixed and not vary from year to year." In reality however, state Haar and Kalsi (2009), the introduction of the Nanakshahi calendar has resulted in many festivals being "celebrated on two dates depending on the choice of the management of the local gurdwaras."

In 2017, a conference was held in Chicago where it was decided to fix the three movable dates from the 2003 version and fully follow the original version published in 1999.

Sikh historian Harjinder Singh Dilgeer has rejected this calendar fully. Even Anurag Singh and Surjit Singh Nishaan too have rejected this calendar.

Mool Nanakshahi Calendar
The "Mool" prefix, means "original". SGPC released a calendar that was close to this one on the 300th year of Khalsa's Creation in 1999. In 2003, Pal Singh Purewal, who had been working towards the Sikh calendar since the 1960s, introduced the Nanakshahi Calendar. The Shiromani Gurdwara Prabandhak Committee had implemented and launched the copies of the Mool Nanakshahi Calendar on 14 April 2003 from the land of Takhat Sri Damdama Sahib under the presidency of prominent Sikh scholar Prof Kirpal Singh Badungar and Akal Takhat Jathedar Giani Joginder Singh Vedanti (chairman of the committee for Mool Nanakshahi Calendar) on the occasion of Baisakhi in the presence of large community gathering (unlike Bikrami calendar which is based on lunar setup the Mool Nanakshahi Calendar was largely based on solar system). As per the SGPC records 21 meetings were held having deep deliberations before the implementation of this Calendar. Sikhs throughout the world have embraced the Mool Nanakshahi Calendar with full reverence as the Sikh scholars with empirical research have held that the Calendar had its roots to the First Khalsa Raj established by Baba Banda Singh Bahadur who first released and implemented it.

A Calendar Reform Committee composed of many scholars and representatives of various academic institutions met at the Institute of Sikh Studies in Chandigarh in 1995.  In 1996, a formal proposal was submitted to the Shiromani Gurdwara Prabandhak Committee (SGPC).  The SGPC issued a General House Resolution asking the Sikhs across the world to adopt the Sikh Calendar.  In 2003, although some of the dates were largely adopted as fixed dates, some due to cultural and political concerns were dismissed and reverted to Bikrami dates, which were later synchronized in 2017 when the Mool Nanakshahi Calendar was introduced to fix all dates.

Pal Singh Purewal, introduced the term Mool (original) Nanakshahi Calendar in 2017.  The new term meant to distinguish from the current Nanakshahi Calendar which was altered in 2003 to include movable Bikrami dates in addition to the new adopted dates by the SGPC in 1999.  This pre-altered versional of the calendar was the one proposed by the Calendar Reform Committee in 1995 and accepted by the SGPC in 1999.  The original calendar synchronized Mool Nanakshahi (religious) Calendar with Common Era (CE) Calendar, permanently and hence termed Mool Nanakshahi Calendar.

There are notable differences between the Nanakshahi Calendar and the Mool Nanakshahi Calendar.  Understanding the motivation and decades of research to reflect the accuracy of historical events is essential.   The Mool Nanakshahi Calendar continues to gather support across the world as Sikhs yearn to follow fixed dates which are an accurate historical representation of the Sikh History and an attempt at adding integrity to the Sikh identity. This provides the platform for Sikhs to agree on a common calendar.  Sardar Pal Singh Purewal, the main architect of the calendar,  has written scholarly articles on this issue and explains the difference between the Mool Nanakshahi Calendar and Bikrami Calendars.  There is a difference between the Nanakshai Calendar and the Mool Nanakshahi Calendar as such as the Mool Nanakshahi Calendar fixes dates which were movable in the Nanakshahi Calendar.

In 2018, The Akal Takhat Jathedar, Giani Gurbachan Singh asked that the Sikhs should unite and adopt the new Nanakshahi Calendar and that the "majority of Sikh sects, including Nihangs, Nirmalays, Udhasis and Damdami Taksal, observe and want to observe Sikh religious days according to the (amended) Nanakshahi calendar.". The Sikh communities around the world are embracing the calendar.

The Sikh Youth of Punjab (SYP) embraces this version of the calendar.

In the News
The extensive 2 day Mool Nanakshahi Calendar Implementation Conference in Chicago detailed the significance of the changes.  Several scholars and topics on this topic lead the presentations and discussions.
 Mool Nanakshahi Calendar gains momentum across the world.
 March 2020, Pakistan Sikh Gurdwara Prabadhak Committee released the Mool Nanakshahi Calendar.

Significant Resolutions
Significant resolutions were adopted at the Chicago conference in December 2017.  More importantly three dates were fixed for the upcoming years so that the Nanak's Gurpurab, Bandee Chorrd Divas, and Holla-Muhalla fall on the same date each year.  The fixed dates, in addition to the already constant Vaisakhi 14 April date, are:

 Bandee Chorrd Divas – 12 February every year
 Holla-Muhalla – 14 March every year
 Guru Nanak's Gurpurab – 14 April every year
 Vaisakhi – 14 April every year

Months (2014 version)
The start date of the months in the modified Nanakshahi calendar are not fixed and hence do not correspond to the seasons.

See also
 Punjabi calendar
 Indian national calendar
 Hindu calendar
 Bengali calendar

References

External links
 Purewal.biz, the website of Mr. Pal Singh Purewal, the creator of the Nanakshahi Calendar, this site contains detailed articles about this calendar.
 Nanakshahi Calendar at BBC
 Nanakshahi.net A website to get the Nanakshahi Calendar info and get Sikh Holiday dates, based on an Open Source JavaScript Library.

 
Specific calendars
Time in India